The 2017 mayoral election in Lansing, Michigan, was held on November 7, 2017 to elect the Mayor of Lansing, Michigan. Andy Schor, a member of the Democratic Party, was elected to his first term as mayor.

Background
Twelve-year incumbent Virg Bernero, a Democrat, declined to seek re-election in 2017.

Campaign
Five candidates ran in the primary election: Andy Schor, a member of the Michigan House of Representatives; city council member and former athlete Judi Brown Clarke; former city council member Harold Leeman Jr.; Daniel Trevino, the son of a medical marijuana shop owner; and retiree Michael Joseph Gillenkirk, who previously worked for the Michigan Chamber of Commerce and the Michigan Republican Party. Schor and Clarke placed first and second in the primary and so advanced to the general election.

Results
Primary election, August 8, 2017
Andy Schor – 8,402 (68.37%)
Judi Brown Clarke – 2,874 (23.39%)
Danny Trevino – 452 (3.68%)
Michael Joseph Gillenkirk – 367 (2.99%)
Harold Leeman Jr. – 194 (1.58%)

General election, November 7, 2017
Andy Schor – 12,407 (72.09%)
Judi Brown Clarke – 4,804 (27.91%)

See also
 2017 United States elections
 List of mayors of Lansing, Michigan

References

Lansing
2017 Michigan elections
Local elections in Michigan
Lansing, Michigan
Lansing